Meir Nimni (29 September 1948 – 25 June 2017) was an Israeli footballer. He competed in the men's tournament at the 1976 Summer Olympics.

References

External links
 
 

1948 births
2017 deaths
Israeli footballers
Israel international footballers
Olympic footballers of Israel
Footballers at the 1976 Summer Olympics
Place of birth missing
Association football defenders
Asian Games medalists in football
Asian Games silver medalists for Israel
Footballers at the 1974 Asian Games
Medalists at the 1974 Asian Games
Maccabi Tel Aviv F.C. players
Beitar Tel Aviv F.C. players